Hunter Street  located in the Sydney central business district in New South Wales, Australia is one of the oldest streets in Sydney. It runs from George Street in the west to Macquarie Street in the east. The street was originally named Bell Street. It is named after Governor Hunter, the second Governor of New South Wales.

In the 1860s the street housed the glove shop of 'Sharp Lewis' whose large gloved hand swung over the footpath. Next door were the 'Parrot Brothers', who supplied footwear to the people of Sydney. The site of the old Norwich Chambers on the corner of Bligh Street was once occupied by a dentist named Smythe and later was the office of the solicitor William Barker. It was built in 1886 and demolished in 1922. The heritage-listed office building Perpetual Trustee Company Building at 33-39 Hunter Street is the only example of Edwardian architecture on Hunter Street. Hunter Street is perhaps most famous for housing the Frankie's Pizza By The Slice, a famous rock music bar and nightclub located at 55 Hunter Street. Frankie's closed in 2022 to make way for a Sydney Metro station. Originally two-way throughout, in February 1987 the Pitt to George Street section was converted to one-way in a westerly direction.

References

External links

Streets in Sydney
Sydney central business district